Wayne Ryan (born 5 May 1996 in Camden) is a British Grand Prix motorcycle racer.

Career statistics

2007- 2nd, British 50GP Conti Cup #12    Conti
2008- 5th, British Aprilia Superteens #12    Aprilia
2009- 1st, British Aprilia Superteens #12    Aprilia
2010- 13th, British 125cc Championship #98    Honda RS125R
2011- 2nd, British 125cc Championship #98    Honda RS125R
2012- 23rd, CEV Moto3 Championship #98    KRP Honda 
2013- 9th, CEV Moto3 Championship #98    KRP Honda  
2014- 26th, FIM CEV Moto3 Championship #69    KTM RC250GP
2015- 17th, National Superstock 600 Championship #98    Kawasaki ZX-6R

Grand Prix motorcycle racing

By season

Races by year
(key)

External links

1996 births
Living people
British motorcycle racers
Moto3 World Championship riders
People from the London Borough of Camden